Trine University is a private university in Angola, Indiana, and Fort Wayne, Indiana, with education centers in Detroit and Phoenix. It was founded in 1884 and is accredited by the Higher Learning Commission.

History
Trine was founded in 1884 as Tri-State Normal College and retained the reference to the "tri-state" area for more than 120 years because of its location in Indiana and proximity to Michigan and Ohio. In 1906, the school was renamed Tri-State College, and in 1975 Tri-State University.

The school served its regional population, first as a teachers and engineering school with flexible evening and weekend courses and then broadening into a multidisciplinary institution with an expansion of daytime classes, an athletics program and more robust student life offerings. On June 1, 1963, Tri-State succeeded in achieving its initial regional accreditation. It has remained an accredited institution since that time, most recently extending its Level V accreditation until the next (2026) evaluation visit. Further, the Ketner School of Business was reaffirmed by the Accreditation Council for Business Schools and Programs (ACBSP) on February 26, 2019.

In 2002 the school joined the Michigan Intercollegiate Athletic Association (MIAA), and, coinciding with the opening of the $650,000 Ketner Sports Complex, Tri-State attained NCAA Division III provisional membership.

Already with over 100 years of teaching engineering courses, in 2005 the university graduated its first class of Master of Science in Engineering Technology students.

In 2008, the school's name was changed to the Trine University, in honor of alumnus Ralph Trine and his wife Sheri. The dropping of the "tri-state" identifier reflected a desire to brand the school as a nationally competitive private university, not to be mistaken for state-funded or associated with businesses or organizations nationwide also using the term "tri-state". During the 1990s, the university opened several education centers throughout northern and central Indiana. The education center programs were eventually moved to online-only.

Campus
Trine’s Angola, Indiana, campus covers 450 acres (1.8 km2). Campus facilities have been greatly expanded since 2000, with more than $176 million invested in building projects during that time. In addition to multiple residential facilities, recent additions have included the T. Furth Center for Performing Arts, a music education and concert venue, the Thunder Ice Arena, which allowed the university to launch hockey and skating teams and offer community skating programs, the MTI Center, serving basketball, bowling and esports, and the Steel Dynamics Inc. Center for Engineering and Computing. The university has also expanded Best Hall of Science twice since 2016 to accommodate its growing number of health sciences students.

Trine’s College of Health Professions is currently located in Fort Wayne, Indiana, at 1818/1819 Carew Street on the Parkview Hospital Randallia Campus. The university has raised more than $20 million for a new Fort Wayne location to house the College of Health Professions. The new facility, scheduled to open in fall 2024, will be located near Parkview Regional Medical Center.

The university’s Detroit Education Center is located at 1000 Republic Drive, Suite 520, Allen Park. The Phoenix Education Center is located at the Maricopa County Medical Society Building, 326 E Coronado Road, Phoenix, Arizona. Both sites offer international students the opportunity to earn a master’s degree through Trine University.

Academics
Trine offers associate degrees, bachelor's degrees, master's degrees, and a doctorate in more than 50 fields of study (39 traditional undergraduate degrees) and has a 16:1 student-to-faculty ratio. For more than 100 years after the founding of its engineering school in 1902, the university focused heavily on engineering education, and engineering majors still make up more than 40 percent of its student body. Trine continues to expand its engineering and technology programs, most recently adding majors in mechatronics and robotics and extended reality. The university also launched the Trine Center for Technical Training in fall 2022 to provide technical training and professional development to area businesses, workers and students.

In addition to undergraduate programs on its Angola campus and health professions programs in Fort Wayne, the university offers graduate degrees at its Detroit and Phoenix education centers. It also offers undergraduate and graduate degrees in the broad categories of business administration, engineering and technology, general students, healthcare, leadership and justice and psychology through TrineOnline. Its most popular undergraduate majors, by 2021 graduates, were:
 Exercise Science and Kinesiology (53)
 Design Engineering Technology (49)
 Mechanical Engineering (33)
 Biology/Biological Sciences (30)
 Civil Engineering (28)
 Criminal Justice/Safety Studies (23)
 Biomedical Engineering (22)
 Business/Commerce (21)
 Chemical Engineering (21)

Accreditation
Trine University is accredited by the Higher Learning Commission. Several individual programs are also accredited by specific bodies:

 Engineering (biomedical, chemical, civil, computer, electrical, mechanical and software): ABET
 Teacher preparation: Council for the Accreditation of Educator Preparation
 Business administration (associate and bachelor’s), associate in accounting: Accreditation Council for Business Schools and Programs
 Physical therapy: Commission on Accreditation in Physical Therapy Education
 Physician assistant studies: Accreditation Review Commission on Education for the Physician Assistant
 RN-BSN: Commission on Collegiate Nursing Education
 Surgical Technology: Commission on Accreditation of Allied Health Education Programs

Student life
More than 2,200 students live on the Angola campus which hosts approximately 60 varied campus groups from professional or major-specific clubs, recreational sports, religiously affiliated groups, and an array of hobby or interest clubs.

The university has seen significant growth in the number of its residential students, currently boasting more than four times as many students living on campus as it had in 2000. As a result, the university has added several newer residential facilities, including the Golf Course Apartments, Villas, Reiners and Stadium Halls, and Fabiani Hall. In addition, upperclass students have the option of living in Greek housing or Christian Campus House facilities.

The university boasts a very active Greek community. For more, see Greek Life at Trine University.

Athletics
The Trine athletic teams are called the Thunder. The university is a member of the Division III level of the National Collegiate Athletic Association (NCAA), primarily competing in the Michigan Intercollegiate Athletic Association (MIAA) since the 2004–05 academic year. The Thunder previously competed as an NCAA D-III Independent during the 2003–04 school year; in the Wolverine–Hoosier Athletic Conference (WHAC) of the National Association of Intercollegiate Athletics (NAIA) from 1992–93 to 2002–03; and in the NAIA's Mid-Central College Conference (MCCC; now currently known as the Crossroads League since the 2012–13 school year) from 1959–60 to 1980–81.

Trine competes in 36 intercollegiate varsity sports: Men's sports include baseball, basketball, bowling, cross country, football, golf, ice hockey, lacrosse, rugby, soccer, tennis, track & field, volleyball, and wrestling; while women's sports include acrobatics & tumbling, basketball, bowling, cross country, golf, ice hockey, lacrosse, soccer, softball, tennis, track & field, triathlon, volleyball, and wrestling.

Trine University athletic teams have won or been finalists for several national titles. In 2021, the women’s triathlon team won the DIII title in the Women’s Triathlon Collegiate National Championships. In 2022, the women’s basketball team advanced to the NCAA Division III Final Four and the softball team finished second in NCAA Division III.

Ice hockey
Trine added men's and women's hockey as varsity sports in the fall of 2017. The programs are housed in the Thunder Ice Arena, which also opened in 2017. Trine’s NCAA Division III teams compete in the Northern Collegiate Hockey Association.

Men's volleyball
Men's volleyball, which had last played at the varsity level in 2002, returned to full varsity status for the 2019 season (2018–19 school year) and plays in the Midwest Collegiate Volleyball League.

Facilities
Trine's Zollner Golf Course hosted the 2012 NCAA Division III Women's Golf National Championships. Trine’s Zollner Golf Course, which has been part of the university since 1971, hosted the 2012 NCAA Division III Women’s Golf National Championships. The course was named the sixth-best collegiate course in the nation by GolfAdvisor in 2020.

The university’s other athletic facilities include:
 Zollner Stadium and Shive Field, serving football, lacrosse and rubgy
 Jannen Field, serving baseball
 SportONE/Parkview Softball Field
 Weaver Field, serving soccer
 Keith E. Busse/Steel Dynamics Inc. Athletic and Recreation, serving indoor track and field and hosting indoor practices for tennis, baseball and softball
 Hershey Hall, which serves volleyball and wrestling
 MTI Center, which serves basketball, bowling and esports
 Ryan Tennis Center

Notable alumni
 Ralph Ketner – co-founder of Food Town, later to become Food Lion, a 1,300-store supermarket chain in the mid-Atlantic and southeast United States.
 Isabelle French – President of the Society of Women Engineers from 1964 to 1966.
 Gustavo Rojas Pinilla – the 19th President of Colombia from June 1953 to May 1957. An Army general, he mounted a successful coup d'état against incumbent President Laureano Gómez Castro (1889–1965), imposing martial law and establishing a dictatorship-style government in Colombia. Rojas enacted legislation that gave women equal rights to vote. He introduced television and constructed several hospitals, universities, and the National Astronomic Observatory.
 Rupa Shanmugam – President and COO of SoPark Corporation in New York.
 Eric Watt – Gagliardi Trophy winner (Division III football's most prestigious individual award).
 Adam Shiltz – All-MIAA Conference First Team Pitcher 2008.
 Brett Halliday – Author famous for his Mike Shayne mystery series.
 Joe Schroeder – Part of the USA men's rugby 7s team at the 2020 Summer Olympics.
 John J. McKetta – American chemical engineer known for his research on more efficient ways to create energy and the thermodynamic properties of hydrocarbons.
 Lewis Blaine Hershey - United States Army general and second Director of the Selective Service System
 Shaziman Abu Mansor - Malaysian politician, a prominent member of the United Malays National Organisation (UMNO), a component party of Barisan Nasional (BN) coalition.

References

External links

 
 Official athletics website

 
Private universities and colleges in Indiana
Educational institutions established in 1884
Education in Fort Wayne, Indiana
Education in Steuben County, Indiana
Education in St. Joseph County, Indiana
Education in Lake County, Indiana
Education in Maricopa County, Arizona
Buildings and structures in Steuben County, Indiana
Merrillville, Indiana
1884 establishments in Indiana